Fantastic Max is an animated cartoon series, originally aired from 1988 to 1990 created by Hanna-Barbera Productions, Kalisto Ltd., Booker PLC and Tanaka Promotion Co. and in association with S4C. It centers on a boy named Maxwell "Fantastic Max" Young who has adventures in outer space with two of his toys: FX, a pull string alien doll from a planet called Twinkle-Twinkle, and A.B. Sitter, a C-3PO-like android made of blocks.

History
The show was developed by Judy Rothman and Robin Lyons from Siriol Animation as part of the creation of Kalisto Ltd. and the series was originally called Space Baby before being developed by Mike Young and produced by Hanna-Barbera Productions further. In the United States, Fantastic Max ran in syndication for two years as part of the weekly Funtastic World of Hanna-Barbera program block. The first episode aired on Sunday September 11, 1988, and the last first-run episode aired on January 21, 1990. Boomerang aired re-runs of the show until November 2013. In the United Kingdom, the series was broadcast on CBBC, but this time all the episodes were split into two parts and the original 1986 pilot episode of the series named Space Baby with the footage that matches the episode "From Here to Twinkle Twinkle" was first broadcast on BBC1 at 3:50pm on December 30, 1987.

Characters

Protagonists
Maxwell "Fantastic Max" Young – A baby boy who was given the abilities of speech and intellect by his alien doll, FX. Max is very brave and adventurous, but his actions often get him in trouble. However, despite this, Max cares for his friends and the people he meets. His catchphrase is "Dirty diapers!", which he exclaims whenever things go wrong.
FX –  An alien doll with magical powers that can create virtually anything, such as a baby-bottle-shaped rocket out of sand which Max uses to travel through space. He is Max's best friend, as shown in "From Here to Twinkle, Twinkle" where he was crying after being separated from Max. His catchphrase is "Rocket and Roll!" which is also the command for using his powers.
A.B. Sitter – A toy robot who was brought to life by FX, and his origins were explained in the episode "Straight Flush". He is often trying hard to keep Max out of danger, but it seldom works and he often ends up annoying Max. He acts like a nanny to Max. A.B. doesn't enjoy going in outer space as much as the others, but he goes anyway in order to keep Max out of trouble. He provides most of the mature humor in the show. He also has the fewest episodes dedicated to him as a whole.
Zoe Young – Max's five-year-old sister who is occasionally dragged into her brother's adventures. Max doesn't think very highly of her, and often calls her dumb. She is rivals with her next door neighbor, Ben. She frequently becomes suspicious of her brother's travels, but Max puts her to sleep so she can't reveal their secret. She is usually reprimanded (and grounded) at the end of Max's travels, especially by her strict Dad, for her impish and mischievous behavior. Zoe is called Suzy in the German dub.
Mr. and Mrs. Young – Max and Zoe's parents who are completely oblivious to their infant son's true personality. They seem to pay a lot more attention to Max than Zoe. Their faces and backs of their heads are never seen at all.
King Klutzes – A jovial knight with an orange goatee (and mustache to go with his goatee) who rode a white horse and befriended Max, A.B. and FX when they were lost. He needed their assistance for a riddle involving dragons and the answer, not given until near the end of the episode, was "a zipper". He only appears in "Stitches in Time".
Rooty the Carrot – A giant carrot from a planet inhabited by vegetables, he was taken by Zoe and entered in a carrot growing contest. He enlisted Max's help to escape from a giant rabbit named Fatso who wanted to eat him. He eventually returned to his planet at the end of the episode. His only appearance was in "Carrot Encounter of the Third Kind".
Denise – A baby and a good friend of Max. She attends Sherman's Daycare Center with her friend Magik. She and Magik went into space when Max was bored in Sherman's Daycare center, needed to amuse himself and flew into space. Denise seems to be silent since she can't talk, although she explains with Max and Magik one time when they all said "(laughs) Space Gypsies". She, along with Max and Magik, loves candy (especially bubble gum). She only appeared in the episode "All in a Babe's Work"
Magik – A baby and is a good friend of Max. He only appeared in "All in a Babe's Work" Unlike Denise, he speaks well with the phrase "My man" in response to his friend Max. He attends Sherman's Daycare Center. When Max was bored, he wanted to go on an adventure into space with him and Denise. They are later captured by Goldie and his Space Gypsies when they took his gumballs in space and he also doesn't want Denise to see Max being taken into a bath by Zelda, one of the Space Gypsies. He later helped Max save A.B. and FX from Goldie when he tried to sell them for a price. After their space adventure with the Space Gypsies, he and Denise are clever and became a little adventurous. He loves candy especially bubblegum for stopping villains. He only appeared in the episode "All in a Babe's Work"

Antagonists

 W.T. Twiggins – 

Bronx – A ringmaster. Only appearance was "Monkey See, Monkey Zoo".
Goldie – A space gypsy. Only appearance was "All in a Babe's Work". His catchphrase was "Goldie the (laughs) Space Gypsy" while gypsy-style music played in the background. He is seen with two other space gypsy subordinates, Cosmo and Gar. Gar's name is only mentioned once by Goldie himself and, apart from only having one scene, where he fires Max and the gang with a gypsy gun filled with whipped cream vermicelli and speaks no lines, is only given a mere background appearance.
Dumping Jack Trash – A garbage man who always spoke in rhyme. Only appearances in Season 1 were "From Here to Twinkle, Twinkle", "Attack of the Cubic Rubes", and "Beach Blanket Baby", and "Puzzle, Puzzle, Toil and Trouble" in Season 2. He was used to replace Texas Pete from SuperTed when that cartoon was phased out in 1988; thereby, like when older characters are dropped and are usually replaced by new characters when it made a sequel show called The Further Adventures of SuperTed, "Beach Blanket Baby" could be the replacement episode in this cartoon for the SuperTed episode "Superted at the Funfair".
XS (voiced by Dana Hill) – FX's mischievous cousin who first appeared in "Cooking Mother Goose". He also appears in "Boo Who"? and "From Here to Twinkle, Twinkle". He enjoys teasing FX for being easily scared, but in "Boo Who?" he becomes a fraidy-cat himself. His command for using his powers is "Rock 'em and Sock 'em!"
Amanda (voiced by Nancy Cartwright) – She is Zoe's friend, but doesn't seem to be, since she doesn't believe in superstitions and ridicules Zoe for acting weird. She even walks out on her and is never seen again in the cartoon. Her only appearance is "Cooking Mother Goose".
Ben Letterman – Even though he is a main character, his only appearances in season one were "Carrot Encounters of the Third Kind" and "From Here to Twinkle, Twinkle", followed by season two appearances in "Boo Who?" and "Ben the Blackmailer" (the only two season two episodes he appeared in) as well. So he only appeared in episodes A and B, but he also only appeared in episodes X and Y. Both can't be true. He is the Young family's next door neighbor, and is Zoe's rival. Max, FX and A.B. don't like him very much, as he is always bothering them and a boaster, plus he plays all sorts of mean tricks on them. According to Max, Ben is a bigger jerk than Zoe.
Fatso – A big rabbit from another planet that wants to carrotnap Rooty and eat him. His name is pronounced "FahZo" (the t is silent) and his only appearance was in "Carrot Encounters of the Third Kind".
Magellan the Cloud Keeper AKA Evil, nasty, bad-tempered, spiteful, etc. pirate –  Self-explanatory, his only appearance was in "Beach Blanket Baby". He is referred to as 'Magellan the Cloud Keeper'. He's so nasty-tempered, he refused to help Max, AB, FX and the mermaid (as well as the seahorse), when the beach was about to dry.
Pumpernickel – An evil wizard with black hair and a black mustache who tortured the village peasants to pay him by using the dragon as an incentive. He had a pet raven (named "Blackie") who could talk and tried to take over the whole world especially after imprisoning Max and the gang. The only episode featuring him (and Blackie, for that matter) was "Stitches in Time". He also hates pumpernickel bread. As said at the beginning, rather than the traditional long white beard and hair, this evil wizard has only a mustache and has black hair.
Black-Hole Bart – A villainous cowboy who cheats in rodeos and whips with a whiplash. He only appeared in "Cowboy Max".
Mr. Tartar –  A plump villain sporting bling and a blond quiff, who appears with his robot sidekick Mr Wrenchley in the episode "To Tell the Tooth". Tartar is "the most popular man in Tartarville" a town where teeth feature as prominent icons –  for example, the buildings all appear to have been constructed in the image of giant molars. Despite the generous and likable image he has cultivated, he has captured the Tooth Fairy and is stealing teeth from under children's pillows with the intention of having her turn them into cash so he can become the richest man in the Galaxy.
Sticky Wicket – A toy designer who kidnaps FX and tries to turn him into a toy line. He is fired from his job when the company he worked with decided to turn to making tires, while Wicket objected to the idea. He began advertising for cookies called Wicky-Biscuits as his new job. Appeared only in "Toys Will Be Toys".
Unnamed Villain – This villain, only appearing in "Movie Star Max" has waited a long time for Max's film festival. During Max's speech after winning the Maxie award, the villain snatches his diaper (as he claims it to be the galaxy's greatest souvenir) embarrassing Max in front of the whole crowd, covering himself with the award. Max later claims that "the joke's on him" when FX asks if he should look for whoever stole his diaper, probably meaning the diaper was dirty.

Episodes

Pilot

The pilot episode of Fantastic Max, then known as Space Baby, was originally produced in the UK by Siriol Animation in 1986, and premiered on BBC1 in 1987.

Season 1 (1988)

The first season of Fantastic Max was broadcast in the United States on Saturday mornings from September 17 - December 10, 1988 and in the United Kingdom on BBC1 from September 13 - November 28, 1989. In the UK, episodes were split into two parts and aired on successive days. Episodes 1-8 premiered on Wednesdays before moving to a Monday premier for the remainder of the season.

Season 2 (1989-1990)

The second season of Fantastic Max was broadcast in the United States on Sunday mornings from October 29, 1989 to January 21, 1990 and in the United Kingdom on BBC1 as 13 single episodes split into two parts.

Home media
Between 1989 and 1991 four videos were released by the BBC, whereas the three episodes of the British showings on each of the VHS tapes were made into 20 minute stories.

During 1991 Abbey Home Entertainment also released three separate VHS videos with two episodes on each one to which one of them ("Boo Who") which was exclusively released in the Children's Classics range at WHSmith. Also in June 1991, Tempo Kids Club released one single video with one episode on it called "Movie Star Max" (94932).

No DVD releases have been made to date, in either the United Kingdom or the United States.

Cast
 Ben Ryan Ganger -  Max
 Gregg Berger –  A.B. Sitter
 Nancy Cartwright –  FX, Amanda
 Paul Eiding –  Mr. Young (Dad)
 Benji Gregory –  Ben Letterman
 Elisabeth Harnois –  Zoe
 Gail Matthius –  Mrs. Young (Mom), Operator

Additional voices
 Lewis Arquette (Season 2)
 René Auberjonois
 George Ball (Season 2)
 Susan Blu (Season 2)
 Earl Boen (Season 2)
 Hank Azaria (Season 1) - Goldie (uncredited)
 Sorrell Booke (Season 1)
 Phillip Boute (Season 1)
 Greg Burson (Season 2)
 William Callaway (Season 2)
 Hamilton Camp
 Selette Cole (Season 2)
 Townsend Coleman
 Peter Cullen (Season 2)
 Brian Cummings (Season 2)
 Tim Curry (Season 2)
 Jennifer Darling (Season 1)
 Jerry Dexter (Season 1)
 Dick Erdman (Season 2)
 Bernard Erhard (Season 2)
 Pat Fraley (Season 2) –  Rooty the Carrot
 Jeffrey Fried ("From Here to Twinkle Twinkle") - XL
 Joanie Gerber (Season 1)
 Dan Gilvezan (Season 2)
 Dorian Harewood
 Philip Hartman (Season 2)
 Dana Hill –  XS
 Jerry Houser (Season 1)
 Arte Johnson
 Jay Arlin Jones ("From Here to Twinkle Twinkle") - Dumping Jack Trash
 Zale Kessler (Season 2)
 Maurice LaMarche (Season 2)
 Michael Lembeck (Season 1)
 Aaron Lohr (Season 1)
 Laurence Luckinbill (Season 1)
 Danny Mann (Season 1)
 Kenneth Mars (Season 1)
 Kellie Martin
 Nan Martin (Season 1)
 Chuck McCann (Season 1)
 Anne Marie McEvoy ("From Here to Twinkle Twinkle") - Zoe
 Don Messick (Season 1) –  King Klutzes
 Jeremy Miller ("From Here to Twinkle Twinkle") - XS
 Brian Mitchell (Season 2)
 Howard Morris (Season 1)
 Lorenzo Music (Season 1) –  Jackie Loon
 Gennie Nevinson ("From Here to Twinkle Twinkle") - FX, FM
 Alan Oppenheimer (Season 2)
 Rob Paulsen (Season 1)
 Henry Polic II (Season 1)
 Larry Riley - Dumping Jack Trash
 Roger Rose (Season 2)
 Neilson Ross (Season 2)
 Ronnie Schell 
 Avery Schreiber (Season 1)
 Susan Silo (Season 2)
 Greg Snegoff ("From Here to Twinkle Twinkle") - Telephone voice
 John Stephenson (Season 2)
 Carl Steven ("From Here to Twinkle Twinkle") - Ben Letterman 
 Howard Stevens
 Andre Stojka (Season 1)
 Russi Taylor (Season 2)
 Susan Tolsky (Season 2)
 B.J. Ward (Season 1)
 Jimmy Weldon (Season 2)
 Frank Welker (Season 2)
 Edward Winter (Season 1)

References

External links
 

1980s American animated television series
1990s American animated television series
The Funtastic World of Hanna-Barbera
Television series by Hanna-Barbera
1980s British animated television series
1990s British animated television series
1980s British children's television series
1990s British children's television series
S4C original programming
1988 American television series debuts
1988 British television series debuts
1990 American television series endings
1990 British television series endings
Animated television series about children
Animated television series about extraterrestrial life
Sentient toys in fiction
BBC children's television shows
1980s British comic science fiction television series
1990s British comic science fiction television series
1980s American comic science fiction television series
1990s American comic science fiction television series
American children's animated space adventure television series
American children's animated comic science fiction television series
American children's animated science fantasy television series
British children's animated space adventure television series
British children's animated comic science fiction television series
British children's animated science fantasy television series
English-language television shows